Irmfried Eberl (8 September 1910 – 16 February 1948) was an Austrian psychiatrist and medical director of the euthanasia institutes in Brandenburg and Bernburg, who helped set up and was the first commandant of the Treblinka extermination camp where he worked as SS-Obersturmführer from 11 July 1942 until his dismissal on 26 August 1942. He was arrested after the end of the war in January 1948. Eberl hanged himself the following month to avoid trial.

Early life
Irmfried Eberl was born in Bregenz, Austria on 8 September 1910. He joined the Nazi Party on 8 December 1931 while still a medical student at the University of Innsbruck. Eberl graduated from the medical program in 1933 and gained his doctorate a year later. After February 1935 he served as an assistant physician. Trained and practising as a psychiatrist, he was a firm supporter of the mass murder of people with mental disorders.

Killing of disabled persons 
When the T-4 Euthanasia Program commenced, Eberl was a willing participant. On 1 February 1940, at 29 years old, Eberl became the medical director of the killing facility at Brandenburg. In autumn 1941 he assumed the same position at Bernburg Euthanasia Centre. Despite not being formally ordered to take part, psychiatrists such as Eberl were at the center of each stage of justifying, planning and carrying out the mass murder of those with mental disorders, and constituted the connection to the later annihilation of Jews and other "undesirables" in the Holocaust.

Treblinka death camp

When public outcry against Action T-4 forced its abandonment in Germany, Eberl found himself out of work. This did not last long, as the Nazi leadership made the decision to use the Action T-4 personnel to murder much larger numbers of people in Poland, using variations of the methods used in the T-4 killings. Eberl was first transferred to Chełmno extermination camp for a brief stint. On 11 July 1942, Eberl was transferred to the command of Treblinka as part of Operation Reinhard. Eberl's poor management of the camp soon proved to be disastrous in the opinion of his colleague Willi Mentz; although historians point out that the number of transports that were coming in also reflected the high command's wildly unrealistic expectations of Treblinka's ability to "process" these prisoners.

SS-Unterscharführer Willi Mentz, an SS officer at Treblinka, testified of Eberl's leadership:

According to SS-Unterscharführer Hans Hingst:

Eberl was dismissed from Treblinka on 26 August 1942, for incompetence in disposing of the bodies of the thousands of people who had been killed, and was replaced by Franz Stangl, who was previously the commandant of Sobibor extermination camp. Eberl was also relieved of his duty because he was not killing people in an efficient and timely enough manner, and because he was not properly concealing the mass murder from locals. For instance, the stench from decomposition of unburied bodies was such that it could be smelled  from the camp, such as at the nearby village of Treblinka, Masovian Voivodeship, which in turn would make it self-evident that unnatural numbers of deaths were happening nearby, causing concern among locals. The Nazi leadership wished to avoid any inconveniences to their operations that would result from local outcries. Eberl was apparently part of a ring at the camp that was stealing the possessions of the people whom they had murdered and sending them back to cohorts at Hitler's Chancellery in Berlin. This last activity had been expressly forbidden by Himmler, as he wanted this property to be contributed to the German war effort.

In 1970, Stangl, then in prison for his own crimes, described Treblinka when he first came to the death camp while it was still under Eberl's command:

Eberl was sent back to Bernburg Euthanasia Centre for a short spell afterwards.

Apprehension and suicide 
In 1944 he joined the Wehrmacht for the remainder of the war. After the war ended, Eberl continued to practice medicine in Blaubeuren. He found himself a widower following his second wife's death.

Eberl was arrested in January 1948. He hanged himself in his cell the following month to avoid trial.

See also

 List of people who died by suicide by hanging

References 

1910 births
1948 suicides
People from Bregenz
Aktion T4 personnel
Austrian psychiatrists
Chełmno extermination camp personnel
Nazi concentration camp commandants
Physicians in the Nazi Party
Nazis who committed suicide in Germany
Suicides by hanging in Germany
Nazis who committed suicide in prison custody
SS-Obersturmführer
Treblinka extermination camp personnel
University of Innsbruck alumni
Holocaust perpetrators in Poland
1948 deaths